Leeds is an unincorporated community in southwestern Chester County, South Carolina in the Piedmont of South Carolina. Leeds is a small unincorporated community  located at an elevation of around 387 feet.

References

 
 satta king 

Unincorporated communities in Chester County, South Carolina
Unincorporated communities in South Carolina